MultiCare Health System is a not-for-profit American health care organization based in Tacoma, Washington. Founded in 1882, MultiCare provides health care services at dozens of locations, including eight hospitals, across Washington state.

The system also operates Indigo Urgent Care, a chain of urgent care centers in Washington that debuted in 2016. In 2022, Indigo Urgent Care expanded their brand to include primary care, under the new name, Indigo Health.

MultiCare Indigo Health 

MultiCare Indigo Health, which is a digitally-enabled health care brand made up of Indigo Urgent Care, Indigo Primary Care and Indigo Online Care, is Washington State's leading urgent care and online primary care provider. Book same-day or next day health care services. Care is available in-person or via virtual visit.

Hospitals
 Mary Bridge Children's Hospital and Health Center
 MultiCare Allenmore Hospital
 MultiCare Auburn Medical
 MultiCare Capital Medical Center
 MultiCare Covington Medical Center
 MultiCare Deaconess Hospital
 MultiCare Good Samaritan Hospital
 MultiCare Tacoma General Hospital
 MultiCare Yakima Memorial Hospital

References

External links
 
 Indigo Health

Medical and health organizations based in Washington (state)